Stancu is a Romanian surname. Notable people with the surname include:

Bogdan Stancu (born 1987), Romanian football player
Constantin Romeo Stancu, Romanian football player who plays as a midfielder
Constantin Stancu (born 1956), retired Romanian football player
Gheorghe Bunea Stancu (born 1954), Romanian politician
Ionuț Cristian Stancu (born 1983), Romanian football wingback
Stelian Stancu (born 1981), Romanian football player
Zaharia Stancu (1902–1974), Romanian prose writer, novelist, poet, and philosopher

Romanian-language surnames